The civil flag of the Silesian Voivodeship, Poland is triband rectangle, divided into three horizontal stripes, that are from top to bottom: blue, yellow, and blue. The blue stripes are twice the size of the yellow middle stripe. The state flag is a blue rectangle with yellow eagle placed in its centre. It was designed by Barbara Widłak, and adopted on 11 June 2001.

Design 
The civil flag of the Silesian Voivodeship, Poland is a triband rectangle, with an aspect ratio of height to width of 5:8. It is divided into three stripes, that are from top to bottom: blue, yellow, and blue. The blue stripes are twice the size of the yellow middle stripe.

The state flag of the voivodeship is a blue rectangle, with an aspect ratio of height to width of 5:8. In its centre is placed a yellow eagle, adopted from the coat of arms of the voivodeship.

The colours of the coat of arms and the flag refer to the coat of arms of Upper Silesia, historically used as a symbol of the dynasty of Silesian Piasts, who ruled in the duchies in the Upper Silesia. The coat of arms depicts a yellow eagle on the blue background, similar to the one in the voivodeship symbols.

Additionally, there are also vertical versions of both civil and state flags.

The colour scheme of the flags is officially defined as:

History 

The Province of Upper Silesia, which was partially located within modern borders of the Silesian Voivodeship, adopted its flag in 1920. It was rectangle divided horizontally into two stripes: yellow on top, and dark blue on the bottom. The aspect ratio of its height to its width was equal 2:3. Its colours had been based on the coat of arms of Upper Silesia. It was used until 1935, when Nazi Germany forbid its provinces from flying its flags, ordering them to replace them with the national flag.

The Silesian Voivodeship was established in 1999. Its flags were designed by Barbara Widłak, and adopted by the Silesian Regional Assembly on 11 June 2001. Since 2011, on 15 July, in the Silesian Voivodeship is celebrated the Day of the Silesian Flag.

Gallery

See also
Flag of Silesia and Lower Silesia
Flag of Upper Silesia
coat of arms of the Silesian Voivodeship

References

Silesia
Silesian Voivodeship
Silesian Voivodeship
Silesian Voivodeship
2001 establishments in Poland
Silesian Voivodeship